Cataegis finkli is a species of sea snail, a marine gastropod mollusk in the family Cataegidae.

Description
Original description: "Shell very large for genus, wide, inflated, turbinate in shape; spire narrow in proportion to shell width, elevated; body whorl ornamented with 8 large, well-developed, raised cords; spire whorls ornamented with 3 cords; outer layer of shell rough-textured, light brown in color; inner layer of shell nacreous with nacre showing through thin areas on spire and early whorls; outer lip and aperture flaring; columella thickened, nacreous, partially covered with white shelly layer; interior of aperture nacreous, iridescent; columella with one small tooth."

The size of the shell varies between 25 mm and 37 mm.

Distribution
Locus typicus: "Off Puerto Cabello, Golfo de Triste, Venezuela."

This species occurs in the Caribbean Sea off Venezuela and Colombia; in the Gulf of Mexico off Florida.

References

 McLean, J.H. & Quinn J.F., 1987. Cataegis, new genus of three new species from the continental slope (Trochidae: Cataeginae New subfamily). The Nautilus 101(3): 111-116

External links
 To Encyclopedia of Life
 To World Register of Marine Species

finkli
Gastropods described in 1987